

Michael Neocosmos is a Marxist philosopher. He is an emeritus professor in humanities at Rhodes University, Distinguished Visiting Scholar at the University of Connecticut Humanities Institute  and a fellow at the Centre for Humanities Research at the University of the Western Cape.

Neocosmos graduated B.Sc. (1972, Loughborough University, UK); MA (1973, Wye College, University of London, UK), Ph.D. (1982, Bradford University, UK). He has taught at various universities in the United Kingdom and in Africa, most especially at the University of Dar es Salaam, Tanzania, at the University of Swaziland, at the National University of Lesotho where he headed the Department of Development Studies, at the University of Botswana where he was Associate Professor of Sociology, the University of Pretoria where he held the position of Professor of Sociology, at Monash University where he was Director of Global Movements Research and at Rhodes University in Grahamstown, South Africa where he was the Director of the Unit for the Humanities at Rhodes University (UHURU).

Awards

In 2017, Neocosmos's book Thinking Freedom in Africa, was awarded The Frantz Fanon Award for Outstanding Book in Caribbean Thought by the Caribbean Philosophical Association.

Works

Books

Articles
From people's politics to state politics: aspects of national liberation in South Africa 1984--1994, 1994
Thinking the Impossible? Elements of a Critique of Political Liberalism in South Africa, 2004
The State of the Post-apartheid State: the poverty of critique on the South African left, 2004
Citizenship, Rights and Development: Revisiting the social in Africa today, 2005
Civil society, citizenship and the politics of the (im)possible: rethinking militancy in Africa today, 2007
The Pogroms in South Africa: The Politics of Fear and the Fear of Politics, 2008
Africa and Migration in a Globalised World, 2008
The Political Meaning of the Attacks on Abahlali baseMjondolo, 2009
The Political Conditions of Social Thought and the Politics of Emancipation: An Introduction to the work of Sylvain Lazarus, 2009
Mass mobilisation, ‘democratic transition’ and ‘transitional violence’ in Africa, 2011
Transition, human rights and violence: rethinking a liberal political relationship in the African neo-colony, Interface, 2011
Are Those-Who-Do-Not-Count Capable of Reason? Thinking Political Subjectivity in the (Neo-)Colonial World and the Limits of History, 2012
Thinking freedom: achieving the impossible collectively - Interview with Michael Neocosmos, 2018

References

External links

 Academia.Edu Profile

South African sociologists
Academic staff of Rhodes University
Alumni of Loughborough University
Alumni of the University of Bradford
Academic staff of the University of Pretoria
Living people
South African Africanists
South African Marxists
Academic staff of the University of Botswana
Year of birth missing (living people)
Alumni of Wye College